Lawrence LeShan (September 8, 1920 – November 9, 2020)  was an American psychologist, educator and the author of the best-selling How to Meditate (1974) a practical guide to meditation. He authored or co-authored approximately 75 articles in the professional literature and thirteen books on a diverse range of topics including psychotherapy, war, cancer treatment, and mysticism. He also wrote science fiction under the pseudonym Edward Grendon.

Biography

LeShan received a bachelor's degree from The College of William and Mary, a masters from University of Nebraska and a Ph.D. in Human Development from the University of Chicago. He taught at Pace College, Roosevelt University, and the New School for Social Research. He worked as a clinical and research psychologist for more than 50 years, including six years as a psychologist in the United States Army. He served in the army from 1943 to 1946 and from 1950 to 1952.

In the 1960s and 1970s, LeShan conducted extensive research in the field of parapsychology. In his book The Medium, the Mystic, and the Physicist: Toward a General Theory of the Paranormal, he investigated paranormal topics, mystical thought and quantum mechanics. In the book LeShan claimed to have tested his hypothesis of "clairvoyant reality". He said the results were a success and he could heal with mental power and train others to do the same. However, Tim Healey wrote the results were not convincing as nine of his students had eight attempts at using a clairvoyant training technique and all scored four to fives misses.

In World of the Paranormal: The Next Frontier, LeShan advanced his paranormal ideas further, claiming that psychic abilities such as  clairvoyance, precognition and telepathy can be explained using quantum theory.

In the 1980s, LeShan's focus shifted to the psychotherapy of cancer support, a field in which he is considered a pioneer. LeShan lived in New York City. LeShan was married to the late Eda LeShan, who was also a writer. He died at the age of 100 in 2020.

Publications
The Medium, the Mystic, and the Physicist: Toward a General Theory of the Paranormal (1974)
How to Meditate: A Guide to Self-Discovery (1974)
Alternate Realities: The Search for the Full Human Being (1976)
You Can Fight For Your Life: Emotional Factors in the Treatment of Cancer (1980)
Einstein's Space & Van Gogh's Sky: Physical Reality and Beyond (with Henry Margenau)(1982)
The Mechanic and the Gardener: How to Make the Most of the Holistic Revolution in Medicine (Introduction by Norman Cousins) (1982)
Holistic Health: How to Understand and Use the Revolution in Medicine (1984)
From Newton to Esp: Parapsychology and the Challenge of Modern Science (1985)
Cancer As a Turning Point: A Handbook for People with Cancer, Their Families, and Health Professionals (1994)
An Ethic for the Age of Space: A Touchstone for Conduct Among the Stars (1996)
Beyond Technique: Psychotherapy for the 21st Century (1996)
The Dilemma of Psychology: A Psychologist Looks at His Troubled Profession (2002)
The Psychology of War: Comprehending Its Mystique and Its Madness (2002)
World of the Paranormal: The Next Frontier (2004)
Patriotism for Grownups (2005)
The Pattern of Evil: Myth, Social Perception and the Holocaust (2006)
A New Science of the Paranormal: the Promise of Psychical Research (2009)
Landscapes of the Mind: The Faces of Reality (2012)

References

External links
 Cancer as a Turning Point

1920 births
2020 deaths
American health and wellness writers
American self-help writers
American spiritual writers
21st-century American psychologists
Parapsychologists
University of Chicago alumni
Pace University faculty
Roosevelt University faculty
The New School faculty
Psychology educators
American centenarians
Men centenarians
United States Army personnel of World War II
University of Nebraska alumni
College of William & Mary alumni